Andés Club de Fútbol is a football team based in Las Cortinas de Andés, Navia in the autonomous community of Asturias. Founded in 1949, the team plays in the Primera Regional de Asturias. The club's home ground is Campo de San Pedro, which has a capacity of 3,000 spectators.

Season to season

7 season in Tercera División

External links
Official website
Futbolme.com profile

Football clubs in Asturias
Association football clubs established in 1949
1949 establishments in Spain